The 1982 Cupa României Final was the 44th final of Romania's most prestigious football cup competition. It was disputed between Dinamo București and FC Baia Mare, and was won by Dinamo București after a game with 5 goals. It was the forth cup for Dinamo București.

FC Baia Mare became the 12th team representing Divizia B that reached the Romanian Cup final.

Route to the final

Match details

See also 
List of Cupa României finals

References

External links
Romaniansoccer.ro

1982
Cupa
Romania
FC Dinamo București matches